The 2008–09 FAW Welsh Cup was the 122nd season of the annual knockout tournament for competitive football teams in Wales, excluding those who play in the English League System. The 2008–09 tournament commenced on 16 August 2008, and was covered live and exclusive on S4C in the UK.

Calendar

Preliminary round
The games were played on 16 August 2008.

South

|}
1First match was postponed and the replay was held at Lock’s Lane, Porthcawl on 3 September 2008

Mid

|}

North

|}

First round
The matches were played on 13 September 2008.

|}

Second round
The matches were played between 3 and 10 October 2008.

|}

Third round
The matches were played on 31 October and 1 November 2008.

|}

Fourth round
The matches were played on 30 and 31 January 2009.

|}

Quarterfinals

Semifinals

Final

External links
 Official site
 welsh-football.net

2008-09
1